Plagiobothrys arizonicus is a species of flowering plant in the borage family known by the common name Arizona popcornflower.

Distribution
The plant is native to the southwestern United States, California, and Sonora (Mexico). It is a common wildflower in many types of mountain, Mojave Desert and Sonoran Desert, and California chaparral and woodland habitats.

Description
Plagiobothrys arizonicus is an annual herb with a spreading or erect stem 10 to 40 centimeters in length. The leaves are located in a basal rosette about the stem, with smaller ones along the length of the stem. The plant is coated in long, rough, sharp hairs. The herbage leaks a staining purple juice when crushed.

The inflorescence is a series of regular bracts and tiny flowers, each five-lobed white corolla less than 3 millimeters wide. The paired nutlets are arch-shaped and not prickly.

References

External links
 Calflora Database: Plagiobothrys arizonicus (Arizona popcorn flower)
Jepson Manual eFlora (TJM2) treatment
UC Photos gallery

arizonicus
Flora of the Southwestern United States
Flora of California
Flora of New Mexico
Flora of Sonora
Flora of the California desert regions
Flora of the Sonoran Deserts
Natural history of the California chaparral and woodlands
Natural history of the Mojave Desert
Natural history of the Peninsular Ranges
Taxa named by Asa Gray